The 1968 Prize of Moscow News was the third edition of an international figure skating competition organized in Moscow, Soviet Union. It was held December 12–15, 1968. Medals were awarded in the disciplines of men's singles, ladies' singles, pair skating and ice dancing. Soviet skaters Sergei Chetverukhin and Elena Shcheglova won the singles categories. The Soviet Union swept the pairs' podium, led by Tamara Moskvina / Alexei Mishin, who defeated Irina Rodnina / Alexei Ulanov. East Germany's national champions, Annerose Baier / Eberhard Rüger, took the ice dancing title.

Men

Ladies

Pairs

Ice dancing

References

Prize of Moscow News
1968 in figure skating